Fimbul is an Old Norse word often used as a prefix for "giant" or "mighty", and may refer to:

 Fimbul Glacier, Greenland
 Fimbul Ice Shelf, Antarctica

Musical works 

Fimbulvetr, a song by Danheim for his album Herja

See also
 Fimbulheimen, Antarctica
 Fimbulisen, Svalbard
 Fimbulwinter, the prelude to the events of Ragnarök